Incredible Shrinking Sphere is a 1989 video game developed by Foursfield and published by Electric Dreams Software for Amiga, Amstrad CPC, Atari ST, Commodore 64, and ZX Spectrum

Plot
On the planet Sangfalmadore, the player is recruited to the Sphere Training Corps. An earthquake has trapped the STC's Colonel Matt Ridley, leaving it up to the player to rescue him.

Gameplay
The game consists of eight levels, each divided into four maze sections. The player must direct the ball to the exit of the maze. Each maze has traps and assassin enemies. Assassins can be countered with collectable shields or ammo. Traps can be tackled by shrinking or enlarging the ball.

Development
Anna Ufnowska's inspiration for designing the game came from the intricate weaving of a pair of slippers. The project began in late February 1988 and took seven months to put together.

Release
The game package included a contest slip offering a chance to win a Tomy Omnibot 2000 or a limited-edition Incredible Shrinking Sphere poster.

Reception

ACE magazine called Incredible Shrinking Sphere an impressive debut for Foursfield because of the realistic ball movement.
The Spanish magazine Microhobby gave the game the following scores: Originality: 80% Graphics: 80% Motion: 80% Sound: 80% Difficulty: 100% Addiction: 100%

References

External links

1989 video games
Action video games
Amiga games
Amstrad CPC games
Atari ST games
Commodore 64 games
Marble games
Video games developed in the United Kingdom
ZX Spectrum games
Video games about size change